The 2012 Singapore ATP Challenger was a professional tennis tournament played on hard courts. It was the second edition of the tournament which was part of the 2012 ATP Challenger Tour. It took place in Singapore between February 27 and March 4, 2012.

Singles main-draw entrants

Seeds

 Rankings are as of February 20, 2012.

Other entrants
The following players received wildcards into the singles main draw:
  Huang Liang-chi
  Christopher Rungkat
  Peerakiat Siriluethaiwattana
  Vishnu Vardhan

The following players received entry from the qualifying draw:
  Hiroyasu Ehara
  Henri Laaksonen
  Divij Sharan
  Jose Statham

Champions

Singles

 Lu Yen-hsun def.  Go Soeda, 6–3, 6–4

Doubles

 Kamil Čapkovič /  Amir Weintraub def.  Hsieh Cheng-peng /  Lee Hsin-han, 6–4, 6–4

References

External links
Official Website
ITF Search
ATP official site

Singapore ATP Challenger
Singapore ATP Challenger
2012 in Singaporean sport